A submarine simulator is usually a computer game in which the player commands a submarine. The usual form of the game is to go on a series of missions, each of which features a number of encounters where the goal is to sink surface ships and to survive counterattacks by destroyers. Submarine simulators are notable for the highly-variable pace of the game; it may take hours of simulated time to get into position to attack a well-defended convoy, and sub simulators typically include an option for players to adjust the ratio of real time to simulated time up and down as desired.

Most submarine simulators use World War II as the setting; its submarine warfare was lengthy and intense, the historical material is extensive, and the limited capabilities of the period's submarines place a high premium on game playing skill. Games usually feature either US submarines in the Pacific Ocean, or German U-boats in the Atlantic Ocean. Another popular category is modern attack submarines, especially those of the  also known as "688s" after the hull identification number of the first vessel of the class.

Game displays generally include an overhead map or "radar" view, showing the submarine and any ships whose position can be detected, the periscope view if the sub is close enough to the surface, a set of gauges showing depth and course, and a boat plan showing torpedo availability, damage to various subsystems and other in-game issues that may arise.

The first submarine simulator available to the civilian public was Thorn EMI's Submarine Commander of 1982.

Titles

The adventure game Codename: ICEMAN (1989) by Sierra On-line contained a submarine simulator portion.

The vehicle simulator game Naval Ops: Warship Gunner 2 (2006) by Koei features submarine hulls & puts the player through several submarine piloting missions, though several other missions are also restricted against submarine use.

AUV simulators
There are also a number of simulators available for underwater robots such as AUVs. These simulators are commonly used by research institutes for testing robot control and coordination algorithms before or during the development of a submarine. One of them is UWSim, the Underwater Simulator, which was developed in the IRSLab for marine robotics research and development. UWSim started with the RAUVI and TRIDENT research projects as a tool for testing and integrating perception and control algorithms before running them on the real robots and has continued its development until today.

References

External links
Subsim.com, a comprehensive information and review site
IRSLab
UWSim